This is a list of dance critics.

List
Alan M. Kriegsman
Alastair Macaulay – The New York Times
Andrea Amort
Anna Kisselgoff
Arlene Croce
Bernard H. Haggin
Brian Seibert
Carl Van Vechten
Cheryl Angear
Claudia La Rocco
Clement Crisp
Clive Barnes
David Dougill
Deborah Jowitt – The Village Voice
Debra Craine
Donald Hutera
Doris Hering
Edwin Denby
Elizabeth Zimmer
George Dorris – Dance Chronicle
George S Paul
Gia Kourlas
Holly Brubach
H.T. Parker
Jack Anderson (dance critic) – The New York Times
Jann Parry – The Observer
Jennifer Dunning
Jennifer Homans
Jill Johnston
Joan Acocella – The New Yorker
John Martin
John Rockwell– The New York Times
John Weaver
Judith Mackrell – The Guardian
Laura Jacobs – The New Criterion
Leigh Witchel
Luke Jennings – The Observer
Marcia B. Siegel
Mary Clarke (dance critic)
Margaret Lloyd
Mary F. Watkins
Maude Lloyd
Michael Seaver – The Irish Times
Robert Gottlieb – The New York Observer
Robert Greskovic
Roland Robinson (poet)
Roslyn Sulcas
S. Gopalakrishnan (writer)
Sanjoy Roy
Sarah Kaufman (critic) – The Washington Post
Stephanie Jordan
Subbudu
Sunil Kothari
Théophile Gautier
Tobi Tobias
Walter Terry

See also
 List of dance personalities

References

Critics
 
Dance critics